Acleris thomasi is a species of moth of the family Tortricidae. It is found in India (Sikkim).

The wingspan is 21–23 mm. The ground colour of the forewings is greenish and brownish distally. There is a diffuse ochreous-yellow fascia between the disc and the tornus, suffused with brown distally and tornally. There are two diffuse brownish rust shades. The discal and apical areas are greyish, marked with refractive silvery scales. The hindwings are brownish-cream, but brownish in the apex area.

References

Moths described in 1990
thomasi
Moths of Asia